Bellow's Spring Methodist Church (also called Mt. Pisgah AME Church) is a historic church in Ellicott City, Howard County, Maryland.

The church was built between Rufus Thompson's farm and Thomas Christian's farm (also known as Bellow's Spring Farm) in the African American community of Jonestown. In 1899 the building was relocated to its present location along Route 108, taking the name Mt. Pisgah AME Church in 1901.

The church is dwarfed by a modern church constructed adjacent to the building and the historical building is kept in poor condition with overgrowth covering the entrance.

See also
List of Howard County properties in the Maryland Historical Trust
Long Reach, Columbia, Maryland
Wheatfield (Ellicott City, Maryland)
Bethesda (Ellicott City, Maryland)
AME Church

References

African-American history of Howard County, Maryland
Howard County, Maryland landmarks
Houses in Howard County, Maryland
African Methodist Episcopal churches in Maryland
Ellicott City, Maryland